Roaring Ranch is a 1930 American pre-Code Western film written and directed by B. Reeves Eason. The film stars Hoot Gibson, and it was released on April 27, 1930, by Universal Pictures.

Cast 
Hoot Gibson as Jim Dailey
Frank Clark as Tom Marlin
Sally Eilers as June Marlin
Wheeler Oakman as Ramsey Kane
Agnes Steele as Mrs. Morgan 
Bobby Nelson as Bobby Morgan
Marlyn Walker as Marlyn
Leo White as Count Reginald Sobieski

References

External links 
 

1930 films
American Western (genre) films
1930 Western (genre) films
Universal Pictures films
Films directed by B. Reeves Eason
American black-and-white films
1930s English-language films
1930s American films